Kepler-419b (also known by its Kepler Object of Interest designation KOI-1474.01) is a hot Jupiter exoplanet orbiting the star Kepler-419, the outermost of two such planets discovered by NASA's Kepler spacecraft. It is located about 3,400 light-years (1040 parsecs from Earth in the constellation Cygnus.

Characteristics

Mass, radius and temperature
Kepler-419b is a hot Jupiter, an exoplanet that has a radius and mass near that of the planet Jupiter, but with an extremely high temperature. It has a mass of 2.5  and a radius of 0.96 .

Host star
The planet orbits an (F-type) star named Kepler-419. The star has a mass of 1.39  and a radius 1.75 . It has a surface temperatures of 6430 K and is 2.8 billion years old. In comparison, the Sun is about 4.6 billion years old and has a surface temperature of 5778 K.

The star's apparent magnitude, or how bright it appears from Earth's perspective, is 13. It is too dim to be seen with the naked eye.

Orbit

Kepler-419c orbits its host star with 270% of the Sun's luminosity (2.7 ) about every 67 days at a distance of 0.37 AU (close to the orbital distance of Mercury from the Sun, which is 0.38 AU). It has a highly eccentric orbit, with an eccentricity of 0.833.

Discovery
In 2009, NASA's Kepler spacecraft was completing observing stars on its photometer, the instrument it uses to detect transit events, in which a planet crosses in front of and dims its host star for a brief and roughly regular period of time. In this last test, Kepler observed  stars in the Kepler Input Catalog, including Kepler-419, the preliminary light curves were sent to the Kepler science team for analysis, who chose obvious planetary companions from the bunch for follow-up at observatories. Observations for the potential exoplanet candidates took place between 13 May 2009 and 17 March 2012. After observing the respective transits, the first planet, Kepler-419b, was announced.

References

External links
 NASA – Kepler Mission.
 NASA – Kepler Discoveries – Summary Table.
 NASA – Kepler-419b at The NASA Exoplanet Archive.
 NASA – Kepler-419b at The Exoplanet Data Explorer.
 NASA – Kepler-419b at The Extrasolar Planets Encyclopaedia.

 

Exoplanets discovered by the Kepler space telescope
Giant planets
Exoplanets discovered in 2014
Transiting exoplanets
Cygnus (constellation)